William Neale (born March 9, 1943 in Fort Erie, Ontario) is a former Canadian figure skater. He was the 1963 National bronze medalist.

Results

References

 skatabase

1943 births
Living people
Canadian male single skaters
Figure skaters at the 1964 Winter Olympics
Olympic figure skaters of Canada
Sportspeople from Fort Erie, Ontario
Sportspeople from Ontario
20th-century Canadian people
21st-century Canadian people